Adolph William Eckstein (May 7, 1902 – June 28, 1963) was an American football player. He is considered the greatest center ever to play for Brown University. He played for two seasons in the National Football League (NFL) with the Providence Steam Roller.

References

American football centers
Providence Steam Roller players
Brown Bears football players
1902 births
1963 deaths